Maria João Fernandes Clemente Lopes Xavier (born 8 March 1971) is a Portuguese former footballer who played as a midfielder. She has been a member of the Portugal women's national team.

International goals
Scores and results list Portugal's goal tally first

References

1971 births
Living people
Portuguese women's footballers
Women's association football midfielders
Sporting CP (women's football) players
Portugal women's international footballers